The men's 10,000 metres at the 2011 European Athletics U23 Championships were held in Ostrava on 14 July.

Medalists

Schedule

Results

Final

Intermediate times:
1000m: 2:52.17 Vyacheslav Shalamov 
2000m: 5:45.90 Vyacheslav Shalamov 
3000m: 8:39.26 Vyacheslav Shalamov 
4000m: 11:35.00 Vyacheslav Shalamov 
5000m: 14:31.68 Roman Pozdyaykin 
6000m: 17:26.95 Musa Roba-Kinkal 
7000m: 20:21.21 Sondre Nordstad Moen 
8000m: 23:07.87 Sondre Nordstad Moen 
9000m: 25:56.06 Sondre Nordstad Moen

Participation
According to an unofficial count, 21 athletes from 13 countries participated in the event.

References

External links

10000 M
10,000 metres at the European Athletics U23 Championships